The 1897 United States Senate election in New York was held on January 19, 1897, by the New York State Legislature to elect a U.S. Senator (Class 3) to represent the State of New York in the United States Senate.

Background
Democrat David B. Hill had been elected to this seat in 1891 and his term was set expire on March 3, 1897.

Composition of the legislature

At the State election in November 1895, 36 Republicans and 14 Democrats were elected for a three-year term (1896–1898) in the state senate. At the State election in November 1896, 114 Republicans and 36 Democrats were elected for the session of 1897 to the Assembly. The 120th New York State Legislature met from January 6 to April 24, 1897, at Albany, New York.

Candidates

Republican caucus
The Republican caucus met on January 14. 149 State legislators attended, and State Senator Cornelius R. Parsons (43rd D.), Ex-Mayor of Rochester, presided. The caucus nominated the Republican boss Thomas C. Platt, who had been briefly a U.S. Senator in 1881, on the first ballot.

Democratic caucus
The Democratic caucus met on January 18. 46 State legislators attended, but 5 walked out before the roll was called, after making speeches against Hill. The incumbent U.S. Senator David B. Hill was re-nominated.

Result
Thomas C. Platt was the choice of both the Assembly and the state senate, and was declared elected. Four anti-Hill Democrats voted for Labor leader Henry George who later the same year ran for Mayor of New York as a "Jefferson Democrat" but died a few days before the election.

Note: The votes were cast on January 19, but both Houses met in a joint session on January 20 to compare nominations, and declare the result.

Aftermath
Platt was re-elected in 1903, and served two terms, remaining in the U.S. Senate until March 3, 1909.

See also 
 United States Senate elections, 1896 and 1897

References 

Members of the 55th United States Congress
PROCEEDINGS OF THE CAUCUS in NYT on January 15, 1897
MR. HILL IS RENOMINATED in NYT on January 19, 1897
MANY SENATORS SELECTED; Platt Gets a Big Majority in Each House of New York's Legislature in NYT on January 20, 1897

1897
United States Senate
New York